Stovky is a football stadium in Frýdek-Místek, Czech Republic. It is the home venue of MFK Frýdek-Místek.

The stadium was built in the 1970s. It was gifted to the town of Frýdek-Místek in 2008 and immediately scheduled for renovation, which was completed in 2011.

References

External links 
 Stovky at the official MFK Frýdek-Místek website 

Football venues in the Czech Republic
Frýdek-Místek
Sport in Frýdek-Místek
1976 establishments in Czechoslovakia
Sports venues completed in 1976
20th-century architecture in the Czech Republic